Bowen is an unincorporated community in Rio Grande County, in the U.S. state of Colorado. Bowen is mentioned, along with Bowen School, in a 1910 USGS report.

Bowen Cemetery and Bowen Community United Methodist Church preserve the place name of the community.

References

External links

 Bowen Cemetery
 Bowen Community United Methodist Church

Unincorporated communities in Rio Grande County, Colorado
Unincorporated communities in Colorado